FUFC may refer to:
Fanad United F.C.
Fauldhouse United F.C.
Felda United F.C.
Fgura United F.C.
Fivemiletown United F.C.
Flame United F.C.
Formartine United F.C.
Fraserburgh United F.C.
Fukushima United F.C.